The Empresa Brasil de Comunicação (EBC; Brazil Communication Company) is a Brazilian public broadcasting state-owned company, created in 2007. The corporation is responsible for the content and management of TV Brasil, eight EBC radio stations (Rádio Nacional do Rio de Janeiro, Rádio Nacional AM de Brasília, Rádio Nacional FM de Brasília, Rádio Nacional da Amazônia, Rádio Nacional do Alto Solimões, Rádio MEC AM do Rio de Janeiro, Rádio MEC FM do Rio de Janeiro, e Rádio MEC AM de Brasília), the news agency Agência Brasil, audio news agency Radioagência Nacional and the EBC Portal. As part of the services provided by the holding, the EBC is responsible for the government's official channel TV NBR, and the radio program A Voz do Brasil.

The EBC is currently headed by Glen Lopes, a President Director appointed by the President of Brazil, Jair Bolsonaro, in 2020. The previous Director-President for the EBC, Ricardo Melo, was dismissed from its functions by then Acting President of Brazil, Michel Temer, and resorted to an appeal to the Supreme Court, arguing that the law which created the EBC stated that its Director-President shall remain in its functions for four consecutive years and, as such, could not be dismissed. In June, Supreme Justice Dias Toffoli granted a primary injunction determining that Melo ought to return to its functions as Director-President. The same judge, Dias Toffoli, revoked his decision on 8 September 2016, and decided that Laerte Rímoli had the right to remain on the position of director-president.

History
The EBC was created by the Brazilian government on Thursday, 25 October 2007, when the Federal Decree No. 6.246 was published in the Diário Oficial da União. The creation of the company was authorized on 10 October 2007, through the Provisional Measure No. 398, converted into the Federal Law No. 11.652 of 7 April 2008. EBC Bylaws was approved on 10 December 2008, by means of the Federal Decree Number 6.689.

The company, then, was created by merging the patrimony and staff from the Empresa Brasileira de Comunicação (Radiobrás) and of the Federal public assets under the guardianship of the Associação de Comunicação Educativa Roquette Pinto (ACERP), which was also coordinating TVE Brasil. A new management contract between the Federal Government and ACERP was signed, and ACERP was now a service provider to the EBC, which took over the channels concessions made to Radiobrás. The EBC creation was authorized through the Provisional Measure 398 (see above). On 1 September 2008, a Provisional Measure (MP 744) which changes the Federal Law No. 11.652, on 7 April 2008, establishing the principles and purposes of the public broadcasting services explored by the Federal Executive Authority or granted to entities that are part of its indirect management and authorizes the Federal Executive Authority to constitute the Empresa Brasil de Comunicação – EBC.

This institution is bound to the Secretariat of Social Communication of the Presidency (SECOM - Secretaria de Comunicação Social da Presidência da República), and is headed by the journalist Laerte Rímoli, appointed to the position of Director-President. The EBC headquarters is in Brasília, but there are production centers and regional offices all over the country. The EBC holds autonomy and editorial independence from the Federal Government to define productions, programming, and content distribution on the public broadcasting system, which aims to promote the exercise of citizenship. The EBC programming is broadcast in television and radio networks (interacting with web medias), containing subjects of education, art, culture, science and technology, and to also foster the regional, national  and independent productions.

The EBC is structured as anonymous society of closed capital, represented by shares, being the Federal Government its sole stakeholder at the moment. However, it is allowed for entities that are part of the indirect federal, state and city government to hold shares from the EBC, up to 49% of its total social capital. The EBC's financing comes from the Federal Budget, besides profit from licensing and production of programs, institutional advertisement, and service rendering to public and private institutions.

Such as the other public companies, the EBC is overseen externally by the Internal Controls Secretariat from the Presidency and by the Federal Court of Auditors.

References

External links

 Agência Brasil
 Portal EBC
 Radioagência Nacional
 Rádios EBC
 TV Brasil
 TV Brasil Internacional
  
 
 
 
 

 
Mass media companies of Brazil
Government-owned companies of Brazil
Publicly funded broadcasters
Mass media companies established in 2007